Maples, Acer species, are used as food plants by the larvae of a number of Lepidoptera species. These include:

Monophagous
Species which feed exclusively on Acer
 Gelechiidae
 Chionodes negundella - feeds on Manitoba maple (Acer negundo)

Polyphagous
Species which feed on Acer and other plants

Bucculatricidae
 Bucculatrix demaryella
 Bucculatrix thoracella
 Coleophoridae
 Coleophora alniella - recorded on red maple (Acer rubrum)
 Geometridae
 Engrailed (Ectropis crepuscularia)
 Feathered thorn (Colotois pennaria)
 Mottled pug (Eupithecia exiguata) - recorded on sycamore maple (Acer pseudoplatanus)
 Mottled umber (Erannis defoliaria)
 November moth (Epirrita dilutata)
 Pale November moth (Epirrita christyi)
 Winter moth (Operophtera brumata)
 Lymantriidae
 Brown-tail (Euproctis chrysorrhoea)
 Noctuidae
 Dun-bar (Cosmia trapezina)
 Grey dagger (Acronicta psi) - recorded on Norway maple (Acer platanoides)
 Miller (Acronicta leporina) - recorded on Norway maple (Acer platanoides)
 Satellite (Eupsilia transversa)
 Setaceous Hebrew character (Xestia c-nigrum)
 Svensson's copper underwing (Amphipyra berbera)
 Sycamore (Acronicta aceris)
 Notodontidae
 Buff-tip (Phalera bucephala) - recorded on Norway maple (Acer platanoides)
 Coxcomb prominent (Ptilodon capucina) - recorded on Norway maple (Acer platanoides)
 Rough prominent (Nadata gibbosa)
 Saturniidae
 Io moth (Automeris io) - recorded on red maple (Acer rubrum)
 Rosy maple moth (Dryocampa rubicunda)
 Imperial moth (Eacles imperialis)
 Polyphemus moth (Antheraea polyphemus)
 Promethea silkmoth (Callosamia promethea)
Cecropia moth (Hyalophora cecropia)

External links

Maples
+Lepidoptera